A referendum on allowing expatriate citizens to vote was held in Paraguay on 9 October 2011. The measure was approved by 78% of voters, although voter turnout was only 12.5%. If approved by the Congress, the measure would give the right to vote to more than half a million Paraguayans living abroad, mostly in Argentina, Spain and the United States. President Fernando Lugo believed it would strengthen Paraguay's democracy.

Results

References

Referendums in Paraguay
2011 referendums
2011 in Paraguay
Expatriate voting
Electoral reform referendums
Electoral reform in Paraguay
October 2011 events in South America